Thomas Parker (ca. 1510 – 1570), of Norwich, Norfolk, was an English politician and haberdasher.

He was a Member of Parliament (MP) for Norwich and mayor of the city in 1568–69.

References

1510 births
1570 deaths
Politicians from Norwich
Mayors of Norwich
English MPs 1563–1567